Brownea rosa-de-monte is a tree in the family Fabaceae, native to Central America and Colombia. Its flowers may bloom for a duration of just one night.

Distribution and habitat
Brownea rosa-de-monte is native to Costa Rica, Nicaragua, Panama and Colombia. Its habitat is in rainforest.

References

rosa-de-monte
Flora of Costa Rica
Flora of Nicaragua
Flora of Panama
Flora of Colombia
Plants described in 1771
Taxa named by Peter Jonas Bergius